ESTEI was a private school in Bordeaux, France. It used to offer two courses: Computer Graphics and Robotic Embedded Systems. The curriculum provided small, professional-level classes covering five years of study which could lead to state recognized certification in the chosen field.

Estei has been bough by the ynov group and most teachings wiped out over the course of the integration (around 2016 to 2020). The scientific part of the degrees vanished to lean more toward high-level informatics.

External links
https://web.archive.org/web/20180507074811/http://www.estei.fr/

Schools in Bordeaux